Torild Wardenær (born 30 November 1951) is a Norwegian poet and playwright. She hails from Stavanger.

She made her literary debut 1994 with the poetry collection I pionértiden, which earned her Aschehoug's debutant prize. She received the Halldis Moren Vesaas Prize in 1998. She was awarded the Mads Wiel Nygaards Endowment and Herman Wildenvey Poetry Award in 1997.  Among her later collections are Paradiseffekten (2004) and PSI (2007).

External links
Official website:
 http://torildwardenaer.no

References

1951 births
Living people
20th-century Norwegian poets
Norwegian dramatists and playwrights
People from Stavanger
Norwegian women poets
Norwegian women dramatists and playwrights
21st-century Norwegian poets
20th-century Norwegian women writers
21st-century Norwegian women writers